Eritrea, officially the State of Eritrea, is a country in the Horn of Africa. The economy of Eritrea has experienced considerable growth in recent years, indicated by an improvement in Gross domestic product (GDP) in October 2012 of 7.5 percent over 2011. However, worker remittances from abroad are estimated to account for 32 percent of gross domestic product. Eritrea has an extensive amount of resources such as copper, gold, granite, marble, and potash. The Eritrean economy has undergone extreme changes due to the War of Independence. In 2011, Eritrea's GDP grew by 8.7 percent, making it one of the fastest-growing economies in the world. The Economist Intelligence Unit (EIU) expects it to maintain a high growth rate of 8.5 percent in 2013.

Companies based in Eritrea

 Asmara Brewery
 Banca per l'Africa Orientale
 Commercial Bank of Eritrea
 Elabored Estate
 Eritrean Investment and Development Bank
 Eritrean Railway
 Eritrean Telecommunications Corporation
 Housing and Commerce Bank
 Nakfa Corporation
 Red Sea Trading Corporation
 Sabur Printing Press

By type

Airlines
 Eritrean Airlines
 Nasair (defunct)
 Red Sea Air (defunct)

Banks

See also

References

Companies of Eritrea
Economy of Eritrea
Companies